Big Sky may refer to:

Arts and entertainment

Films
 Big Sky (film), a 2015 film directed by Jorge Michel Grau
 The Big Sky (film), a 1952 film by Howard Hawks, adapted from the novel

Music

Albums
 Big Sky, a 2000 album by Highway 101
 Big Sky (Brett Garsed album), a 2002 album by Brett Garsed
 Big Sky (One More Girl album), a 2009 album by One More Girl
 Big Sky (The Warratahs album), a 1993 album by The Warratahs

Songs
 "Big Sky" (song), from the Kinks' 1968 studio album The Kinks Are the Village Green Preservation Society
 "Big Sky", a 2004 song by Probot, from their self-titled debut album
 "Big Sky", a 1999 song by Runrig, from their album In Search of Angels
 "The Big Sky" (song), a 1986 song by Kate Bush

Other arts and entertainment
 Big Sky (Australian TV series), an Australian televised drama that ran from 1997 to 1999
 Big Sky (American TV series), a 2020 American procedural drama
 Big Sky (novel), a 2019 novel by Kate Atkinson
 The Big Sky (novel), a 1947 novel by A. B. Guthrie, Jr.

Businesses
 Big Sky Airlines, an American regional airline from 1978 to 2008
 Big Sky Brewing Company, a brewery in Missoula, Montana, United States
 Big Sky Credit Union, an Australia-based credit union
 Big Sky Resort, a ski resort in Big Sky, Montana

People
 Big Sky, nickname of Tye Fields (born 1975), professional boxer
 Big Sky, a ring name, along with Tyler Mane, of Canadian actor and professional wrestler Daryl Karolat

Other uses
 Big Sky, Montana, United States, a census-designated place
 Big Sky Airport, a general aviation airport near Ennis, Montana
 Big Sky Conference, an American collegiate athletic conference
 Big Sky High School, Missoula, Montana

See also
 Big sky theory of transport